Basílio Pina de Oliveira Seguro (died 18 November 2008) was a Portuguese colonial administrator and a military officer. He was governor of the district of Cabo Delgado in Mozambique from 1961 to 1969. He was governor of Cape Verde for over a month from March to 25 April 1974, when he was exempted by decree from the Junta de Salvação Nacional.

Decorations:
Officer of the Military Order of Avis (8 July 1962)
Grand Officer of the Order of Prince Henry the Navigator (14 February 1970)
Commander of the Order of Christ (30 April 1974)
Commander of the Military Order of Avis (21 May 1985)

See also
List of colonial governors of Cape Verde

References

Year of birth unknown
2008 deaths
Colonial heads of Cape Verde
Portuguese colonial governors and administrators